The 2018 Wisconsin Badgers football team represented University of Wisconsin–Madison in the 2018 NCAA Division I FBS football season. The Badgers were led by fourth year head coach Paul Chryst and competed as members of the West Division of the Big Ten Conference. They played their home games at Camp Randall Stadium in Madison, Wisconsin.

Returning many key players from their Orange Bowl-winning 2017 team, the 2018 team was expected to compete for a Big Ten title and a spot in the College Football Playoff. They were ranked fourth in the pre-season AP Poll, tied for the highest start in school history. In the third game of the year, the Badgers were upset by unranked BYU. Wisconsin ultimately lost four more games during the season, including a loss to rival Minnesota that snapped a Wisconsin 14-game winning streak in the series dating back to 2004.  The Badgers were 5–4 in Big Ten play to finish in a three-way tie for second place in the West Division. They were invited to the Pinstripe Bowl to play Miami (FL) in a rematch of the 2017 Orange Bowl, where they defeated the Hurricanes once again to finish the season at 8–5.

The Badgers were led offensively by sophomore running back Jonathan Taylor, who led FBS in both rushing yards (2,194) and rushing attempts (307), and was awarded the Doak Walker Award as the nation's top running back. He became the third Badger player to eclipse the 2,000 yard mark in a single season after Ron Dayne and Melvin Gordon. Taylor was named a consensus first-team All-American, as was offensive lineman Beau Benzschawel. Four members of the offensive line received first-team all-conference honors: Benzschawel, Tyler Biadasz, Michael Deiter, and David Edwards. Quarterback Alex Hornibrook led the team in passing with 1,532 yards and 13 touchdown passes.

Previous season
The Badgers finished the 2017 season 13–1, 9–0 in Big Ten play to win the Big Ten West division. They lost to Ohio State in the Big Ten Championship Game 27–21. They received an invitation to the Orange Bowl where they defeated Miami (FL) 34–24. The 13 wins marked the most wins in school history.

Offseason

2018 NFL Draft

Recruiting

The Badgers signed a total of 20 recruits.

Preseason

Award watch lists

Schedule
Wisconsin's 2018 schedule consisted of 7 home and 5 away games in the regular season. The Badgers hosted Big Ten opponents Nebraska, Illinois, Rutgers, and Minnesota and traveled to Iowa, Michigan, Northwestern, and Penn State, and Purdue.

The team's three non–conference games were against the Western Kentucky Hilltoppers from Conference USA (C-USA), New Mexico Lobos from the Mountain West Conference (MWC), and the BYU Cougars, who compete independently in football.

Schedule Source:

Personnel

Roster

Position key

Game summaries

Western Kentucky

New Mexico

BYU

at Iowa

Nebraska

at Michigan

Illinois

at Northwestern

Rutgers

at Penn State

at Purdue

Minnesota

vs Miami (FL)–Pinstripe Bowl

Rankings

Awards and honors

Players drafted into the NFL

Signed undrafted free agents
 Beau Benzschawel, OL, Detroit Lions
 T. J. Edwards, LB, Philadelphia Eagles
 Alec Ingold, FB, Oakland Raiders

References

Wisconsin
Wisconsin Badgers football seasons
Pinstripe Bowl champion seasons
Wisconsin Badgers football